Kellum–Jessup–Chandler Farm is a historic home and farm located in Guilford Township, Hendricks County, Indiana.  The farmhouse was built about 1862, and is a two-story, central passage plan, brick I-house with Greek Revival style design elements.  It has a gable roof, two-story rear ell, and sits on a brick foundation.  Also on the property are the contributing three traverse frame barns, brick smokehouse, privy, chicken house, dairy barn, milk house, corn crib, and tractor shed.

It was added to the National Register of Historic Places in 1994.

References

Farms on the National Register of Historic Places in Indiana
Greek Revival houses in Indiana
Houses completed in 1862
National Register of Historic Places in Hendricks County, Indiana
Buildings and structures in Hendricks County, Indiana